William Mchombo  is a Zambian  bishop in the Church of the Province of Central Africa.

Mchombo was educated at the University of Zimbabwe. He has been Bishop of Eastern Zambia since 2003.

References

Anglican bishops of Eastern Zambia
21st-century Anglican bishops in Africa
Living people
Year of birth missing (living people)